The olivegreen ufipa barb (Enteromius olivaceus) is an East-African species of freshwater fish in the  family Cyprinidae.

It is found only in Tanzania. Its natural habitat is rivers. It is not considered a threatened species by the IUCN.

References

olivegreen ufipa barb
Endemic freshwater fish of Tanzania
olivegreen ufipa barb
Taxa named by Lothar Seegers
Taxonomy articles created by Polbot